Pomfret School is an independent, coeducational, college preparatory boarding and day school in Pomfret, Connecticut, United States, serving 350 students in grades 9 through 12 and post-graduates. Located in the Pomfret Street Historic District, the average class size is 12 students with a student-teacher ratio of 6:1. Over 80% of faculty hold master's degrees or doctorates. Typically, 40% of students receive financial aid or support from over 60 endowed scholarship funds (see Endowed scholarships), 20% are students of color, 21% are international students.

Pomfret is ranked in the top 20 of similarly sized U.S. boarding schools, in the top 50 of all U.S. boarding schools, and has been recognized as one of the "Most Beautiful Boarding Schools Around the World." The 2008 film Afterschool by Antonio Campos was filmed on Pomfret's campus.

Opened October 3, 1894 by Founder William E. Peck and his wife Harriet Jones Peck, who designed the school's coat of arms, Pomfret's graduates have distinguished themselves in sports, government, the arts, sciences, business, and public service as philanthropists and activists (see Notable alumni). In 2014, Pomfret established The Grauer Family Institute for Excellence and Innovation in Education. Pomfret is accredited by the New England Association of Schools and Colleges (NEASAC). Memberships include the Connecticut Association of Independent Schools (CAIS), the Headmasters' Association, the National Association of Independent Schools (NAIS), the Secondary School Admission Test Board, the Cum Laude Society, and A Better Chance (ABC), The Council for Advancement and Support of Education (CASE), The Association of Boarding Schools (TABS), the Sphere Consortium, the Folio Collaborative, and The Independent Curriculum Group.

Facilities

A number of Pomfret's buildings and houses are listed in the National Register of Historic Places (NRHP).

 500 acre campus, established 1894, designed by landscape designer Frederick Law Olmsted, expanded over the years to its current size through gifts and acquisitions
 Facilities master plan c. 1906 designed by the significant American architect Ernest Flagg
 School Building (NRHP) and Pyne Infirmary (NRHP) completed 1907 
 George Newhall Clark '04 Memorial Chapel (NRHP), 1908, dedicated on St. George's Day, 1908, consecrated on May 16, 1909, also designed by Ernest Flagg, houses a fine pipe organ built by George S. Hutchings Organ Company of Boston that has been restored and expanded over the years, and three extraordinary stained glass windows from 13th century France (see Historical notes)
 Dunworth, Pontefract, Plant, and Bourne dormitories completed 1909 (NRHP); 
 Lewis Gymnasium, gift of Mr. and Mrs. Frederic E. Lewis; completed 1912 (NRHP), also by Ernest Flagg
 Hard Auditorium, 1928, donated by Anson W. Hard, Jr. (class of 1904), and his wife Florence Bourne Hard, daughter of one of the school's first benefactors, Frederic G. Bourne
Main House, 1956 (begun 1954)
 Monell Science Building, 1958, gift of the Ambrose Monell III Foundation (class of 1926) 
Mallory Field, plaque laid 1962
Strong Field House, dedicated 1983
 du Pont Library, 1969, gift of Henry B. du Pont (class of 1916), multi award-winning design by Cambridge Seven Associates
 Centennial Academics and Arts Center, 1996, designed by Mark Simon (class of '64) of Centerbrook Architects & Planners
 Schoppe Dance Studio, established 1999 by former Dance Director, later Associate Head of School Pam Mulcahy, along with Irv and June Schoppe, parents of three Pomfret graduates.
 Olmsted Observatory, 2001, equipped with a Celestron 14 and a Takahashi refracting telescope combined with a super-cooled CCD camera to enable digital photography. The system is robotic and can be fully controlled by students in the observatory or anywhere on campus through the school's wireless network.
 Chester K. Lasell '26 Alumni House, 2001, donated by Honorary Life Trustee Chester K. Lasell '54 and members of the Lasell family in honor of three generations of Lasells graduating from Pomfret.
 Corzine Athletic Center, 2004, gift of Jon Corzine, former governor of New Jersey, and Joanne (Corzine) Brown, parents of a graduate, designed by Tai Soo Kim Partners, expanding and remodeling Lewis Gymnasium
 Olmsted Student Union, 2004, donated by long-serving Trustee Robert Olmsted, designed by Tai Soo Kim Partners
 Jahn Ice Hockey Rink, 2005, designed by architect Helmut Jahn, parent of a recent graduate
 Blodgett Boathouse, 2005, and Blodgett Tennis Center, 2007, gift of Mark Blodgett (class of 1975)
 Parsons Lodge, 2010 AIA Connecticut People's Choice Award for “the building in which people would most like to study”; 2009 Best Fireplace Award from Masonry Construction magazine.
 WBVC (FM) 91.1 FM, a defunct student run radio station
 Picerne, Robinson, Kniffin, Hale, Clement, and Eastover Houses originally built as private homes during the late 1800s and early 1900s (NRHP) and later incorporated into the campus

The Grauer Family Institute for Excellence and Innovation in Education
Founded in 2014 by Laurie and Peter Grauer, parents of two Pomfret graduates, the Grauer Institute at Pomfret School researches and develops innovations in secondary education. The institute is also supported by the Class of 1965 Endowment Fund.

Academics

Curriculum includes a broad range of college preparatory courses in the sciences and liberals arts, including advanced and honors level courses, and foreign language study in Mandarin Chinese, French, Spanish, and Latin. Computer sciences include courses in Web Design, Digital Cinema, Flash, Audio Art, and Gaming Animation. A three-week interdisciplinary project-based learning period known as Project:Pomfret takes place each December, during which faculty and students focus on concentrated thematic projects outside the classroom.

Pomfret's Experiential & Global Learning program offers students the opportunity to study abroad or within the United States in off-campus adventure-based programs, community service, or internships. Students may apply to Pomfret's Global Learning Coordinator at any point during their career at Pomfret for summer, one term, or yearlong programs.

Pomfret academic teams have won numerous awards and championships, including the 2015 Connecticut State Association of Math League (CSAML) Class S State Championship. Recent notable Math Team victories include: 1999 Harvard MIT Math Tournament First Place, 1999 CSAML 1st Place, 2000 Greater New London Competition (GNLC) 1st Place, 2001 CSAML 2nd Place and GNLC 1st Place, 2002 New England Tournament 3rd Place, 2003 CSAML 3rd Place, 2004–2009 GNLC 1st, 2nd, and 3rd Places, 2009 Connecticut State Math Meet 2nd Place, 2010 GNLC 1st Place and Connecticut State Math Meet 3rd Place, 2011 - 2014 GNLC 3rd Place, 2014 CSAML 2nd Place, 2015 Eastern Connecticut Math League 3rd Place and CSAML 1st place.

Athletics

A member of the New England Preparatory School Athletic Council (NEPSAC), Pomfret fields 42 teams in 15 different sports and has won numerous championships during its history in both men's and women's sports. Recently, Girls Varsity Volleyball won the 2015 NESPAC Class B Championship. Boys Varsity Hockey won the 2017 NEPSAC Small School Championship.

Among its alumni are notable collegiate and professional athletes, including two-time, women's hockey Olympic gold medalist, Sarah Vaillancourt '04 and National Hockey League (NHL) player, Brian Flynn '07. Students compete on Varsity, Junior Varsity, and Third and Fourth Form teams (freshmen and sophomores) throughout the year in cross country, field hockey, football, soccer, and volleyball in the fall; basketball, ice hockey, squash, and wrestling in the winter; and baseball, crew, golf, lacrosse, softball, and tennis in spring. Third and Fourth Form students  are required to participate on a team in each of the three seasons each year. Fifth and Sixth Form students (juniors and seniors) are required to participate on at least two teams each year.
Endowments include The Barton L. Mallory, Jr. 1924 Memorial Fund for Athletics and The Griswold Family Fund (1989).

Arts

Pomfret's arts programs are guided by practicing artists and offer formal classes and other opportunities for training and participation in drawing, painting, digital arts, film and video, sculpture and ceramics, photography, music, theatre, and dance. Performance opportunities are available to all students in theater, dance, and music throughout the year. Facilities include sculpture, ceramics, painting, and drawing studios; rehearsal and practice rooms for dance and music; the Schoppe Dance Studio; Hard Auditorium stage; and a photography laboratory.

The Pomfret Grifftones and Chorus tour within the United States and overseas for concerts, most recently to Italy where they performed in Florence, Lucca, and St. Stephen's School in Rome, and in the United States at the University of Connecticut (all March 2015).

Among a variety of musical instruments maintained by the school is a fine pipe organ housed in Clark Memorial Chapel.

Notable alumni

     
 Herbert Claiborne Pell, Jr. 1902, member of Congress (D-NY) and U.S. Minister to Hungary & Portugal 
 Arthur Purdy Stout 1903, noted surgeon and pathologist
 Edward Streeter 1910, New York Times Bestselling author of Father of the Bride and Mr. Hobbs' Vacation, vice president, The Bank of New York c. 1928–1953
 Frederic W. Lincoln IV 1917, former chairman of the Board of Trustees of the New York Medical College
 Edward Stettinius, Jr. 1920, U.S. Secretary of State 1945, instrumental in the creation of the United Nations and first U.S. Ambassador to the United Nations 
 William F. Draper '31, combat artist and prominent portrait painter of U.S. presidents and other notables
 Thibaut de Saint Phalle '35, director of the Export–Import Bank of the United States from 1977 to 1981
 Roger Angell '38, fiction editor and regular contributor at The New Yorker
 Robert Vickrey '44, author, painter in major museum collections, and a leader in the Magic Realism art movement
 Robert B. Fiske '48, United States Attorney and Whitewater controversy Special Prosecutor
 William P. Carey '48, founder of WP Carey, Inc., the Carey Business School at Johns Hopkins University, the Carey School of Law, and the W. P. Carey School of Business at Arizona State University
 Jon Stone '48, Emmy winning founding producer of Sesame Street and author
Theodore R. Sizer '49, noted leader of U.S. educational reform, dean of the Harvard Graduate School of Education (1964–72), founding director of the Annenberg Institute for School Reform, author of numerous influential books on education reform
 Peter Beard '56, nature photographer and conservationist author, numerous international exhibitions, museum and private collections
 Orville Hickock Schell III '58, author, journalist, expert on Asian affairs; former dean, Graduate School of Journalism at the University of California, Berkeley; Arthur Ross Director of the Center on US–China Relations at the Asia Society in New York City; 1980 Alicia Patterson Journalism Fellowship, 1992 Emmy Award and Alfred I. duPont Award - Columbia University Silver Baton for 60 Minutes' Made in China; 1997 Peabody Award  for Frontline's documentary Gate of Heavenly Peace
 Adam Hochschild '60, a founder of Mother Jones, author of the best-selling book King Leopold's Ghost
 Joe Boyd '60, record producer and author of White Bicycles - Making Music in the 1960s
 Jack Hardy '65, influential writer, performer, and mentor in North American and European folk music, founding editor, Fast Folk Musical Magazine
 Antônio Augusto Cançado Trindade '66, professor, Public International Law, University of Brasilia; judge, the International Court of Justice, The Hague; former president, Inter-American Court of Human Rights
 James Rothman '67, Nobel Prize 2013, Fergus F. Wallace Professor of Biomedical Sciences at Yale University, chairman of the Department of Cell Biology at Yale School of Medicine, and director of the Nanobiology Institute at the Yale West Campus
 Eric D. Coleman '69, State Senator, Deputy President Pro Tempore in the Connecticut Senate
 Alex Gibney '71, Academy Award for Best Documentary Feature 2008 Taxi to the Dark Side; multi Emmy winning documentary film director, writer, and producer
 Robert W. McChesney '71, noted author, Gutgsell Endowed Professor in the Department of Communication, University of Illinois at Urbana–Champaign, co-founder of the Free Press (organization).
 Ridley Pearson '71, New York Times best-selling author, Undercurrents, The Art of Deception, The Kingdom Keepers series, Steel Trap: The Academy set at Pomfret School, co-author of the Peter & The Starcatchers series, one of which was adapted for a multi Tony Award-winning Broadway play
 Eben Fiske Ostby '73, founding employee of Pixar Animation, Vice President of Software, 1998 Academy Award, Scientific and Engineering, for development of the Marionette 3-D Computer Animation System; Technical and Modeling Director on Cars 2005, Monsters, Inc., Toy Story and many other motion pictures
 Donald E. Williams, Jr. '75, State Senator, former President Pro Tempore of the Connecticut Senate
 Lorenzo Borghese '91, star of ABC's The Bachelor: Rome and three other reality TV shows, owner of Royal Treatment LLC, maker of pet care products
 Spencer Bailey '04, survivor of United Airlines Flight 232 plane crash; editor-in-chief of Surface
 Sarah Vaillancourt '04, two-time Olympic hockey gold medalist
 Brian Flynn '07, NHL player

Headmasters

The title of Headmaster has been changed to Head of School. Pomfret's Head of School is responsible for all administration and reports to the school's Board of Trustees.

Notable faculty

 Pat Boyd, (D-50) Connecticut State Representative 2017–Present, current history teacher & Assistant Dean of Students
 Michael K. Farr, English teacher, award-winning author, CNBC contributor; founder, president, and CEO of Farr, Miller & Washington, an investment advisory firm

Historical notes

Pomfret's coat of arms

Designed by Harriet Peck Jones, wife of founder and first Headmaster William E. Peck, Pomfret's Coat of Arms is derived from that of the Lords of Pontefract Castle in the town of Pomfret in West Yorkshire, England. In Elizabethan times, the castle and the surrounding medieval market town of Pontefract were referred to as "Pomfret". England's King Richard II died in the castle, by starvation or murder, and the castle has a significant role in William Shakespeare's plays The Life and Death of King Richard the Second, V.i, V.iii, and the penultimate scene V.v which is set entirely in Pomfret Castle; and The Tragedy of King Richard the Third, II.iv, III.i, III.ii, III.iii, all set in Pomfret Castle, and V.iii.

Pomfret's 13th century stained glass windows

Pomfret's Clark memorial chapel contains fine stained glass windows known to have been created by English firm Heaton, Butler & Bayne; and American firms Connick Associates, and Nicola D’Ascenzo for the chapel, completed in 1908. However, the ten-foot-high rose window above the chapel doorway and two of the arched-top, oblong windows along the walls are apparently from the 13th century cathedral, Saint Julien of Tours, on the Loire river in France. Research indicates these three extraordinary windows were removed from St. Julien during one of its many expansions. The arch tops on the two oblong windows were added at a later date to match the others in the chapel. The ancient windows were donated to Pomfret in 1947 in memory of John Grant Fitch ‘42, an alumnus killed in 1945 in Germany during World War II. They are recorded as having been imported to the U.S. in 1904 and offered to New York’s Metropolitan Museum of Art, but were declined due to the extensive restoration needed. They were subsequently auctioned by the Parke-Bernet Galleries in New York to an anonymous bidder, restored by Reynolds, Francis & Rohnstock of Boston, and installed in Clark Chapel in 1949.

Ernest Flagg's architecture for Pomfret

In the first decade of the 1900s, Pomfret was transformed from a collection of "vernacular buildings—most were Colonial Revival frame structures adapted to school use—to a planned institution. The building campaign was financed principally by two patrons: Edward Walker Clark, one of three sons of the Singer [Manufacturing Company] heir, Alfred Corning Clark, and Frederick G. Bourne," then president of that company. By 1906, Flagg had designed a master plan, using the casual relationship among the original buildings and their New England town green style arrangement as his guide for a formal institutional complex. "Flagg’s master plan reinforced the enduring colonial image of the New England village green." The design set a School Building as anchor for a series of semidetached pavilion style dormitories with a connecting open arcade. The Chapel was appropriately located to be visible from the main road, while the gymnasium and infirmary were arranged along the slope of the hill that led to the playing fields. The pavilion arrangement reflected the influence of Thomas Jefferson's design for the University of Virginia. "The dynamic focus of the scheme was the arcade. It acted as a spine and artery, linking the dormitories together while providing covered access to classrooms in the School Building, a Jeffersonian concept that distinguishes both Monticello and UVA. Regrettably, the architectural virtues of the arcade were abandoned in favor of practicality, and in 1957, it was walled-in during dormitory remodeling."

"The School Building with its belfry and white appliqué ornament, similar to the Colonial Revival structures of the former campus, as well as the dormitories and infirmary, maintained a domestic scale and architectural character." For the Chapel, commissioned by Edward Clark in 1907 as a memorial to his son George Newhall Clark (1885–1906), a Pomfret alumnus who died while attending Harvard University, Flagg chose Norman architecture as an appropriate model and emulated the rich textures of the unpolished stone-work characteristic of that style.

Following a visit to the campus in 1910, when construction was nearing completion, Flagg compared Pomfret to his design of the U.S. Naval Academy at Annapolis, remarking, "These buildings are certainly among the best things I have done. The school is better architecturally than Annapolis." While his design for Annapolis had been repeatedly altered by the Navy during construction, the work at Pomfret scrupulously followed his design.

Convinced that American architects should return to eighteenth century forms, both American and French, to revive the lost thread of Renaissance classicism, "Flagg saw Pomfret School as part of the process of evolution that would contribute to the creation of a national style of architecture."

References

External links 
 

Boarding schools in Connecticut
Schools in Windham County, Connecticut
Private high schools in Connecticut
Educational institutions established in 1894
Pomfret, Connecticut
1894 establishments in Connecticut